Salorino is a municipality located in the province of Cáceres, Extremadura, Spain. It is located in the southwest of the province, south of the River Salor. According to the 2006 census (INE), the municipality has a population of 743 inhabitants.

References

Municipalities in the Province of Cáceres